La Irene Formation is a Maastrichtian geologic formation in southern Patagonia, Argentina.

Description 
The formation comprises lithified, sandy sandstones and lithified, argillaceous, sandy shales deposited in a fluvial deltaic environment.

The 110 m below represent a succession of sandy banks clear yellowish brown color to white and dark pelitic packages fining upwards cycles are stacked to form a sequence with a clear trend growing grain and stratum. Sandy banks (coarse to fine sand) show increasing thickness from 2 m at the base to more than 9 m, whereas intercalated mudstones show an opposite trend with thickness ranging from 15 m at the base to 1 m. At the top of lower shaly packets (the thickest) are preserved carbonaceous shale intervals, thinly laminated. 120 m above correspond to a succession of amalgamated conglomeratic sandy banks where preservation is extremely rare shaly intervals.

Fossil content 
The formation has provided many fossil pollen of:
 Podocarpaceae
 Monocotyledoneae
 Liliidae
 Cycadopsida
 Pteridopsida
 Polypodiopsida
 Schizaeaceae
 Gleicheniaceae
 Selaginellaceae
 Lycopodiaceae
 Magnoliopsida
 Dinophyceae

References

Bibliography 
 
 

Geologic formations of Argentina
Cretaceous Argentina
Maastrichtian Stage of South America
Sandstone formations
Shale formations
Deltaic deposits
Fluvial deposits
Formations
Fossiliferous stratigraphic units of South America
Paleontology in Argentina
Geography of Santa Cruz Province, Argentina
Geology of Patagonia